Jake Kevin Puchero, better known by his in-game name Xmithie, is a Filipino-American professional League of Legends player most recently played as a jungler for Immortals of the League of Legends Championship Series (LCS). Xmithie won the NA LCS' 2015 Summer Split and the 2016 Spring Split while on CLG, as well as the 2018 Spring and Summer and 2019 Spring and Summer Splits while on Team Liquid.

Career

Season 1 
Xmithie first entered the League of Legends in January 2011, quickly hitting level 30 and jumping into ranked duo queue, playing with his now ex-girlfriend. For a time during Season 1, Xmithie got stuck and hovered around the 1700 ELO range. However, once he began play solo in ranked, he sprang up to 2200 ELO, where he met other 2000 ELO players to form a team called Soldier Front. Team Soldier Front competed in small tournaments, eventually meeting APictureOfAGoose during a Go4LoL cup in October 2011. After playing against Team Soldier Front, A PictureOfAGoose invited Xmithie to join as their AD Carry substitute player, a position which he accepted.

Season 2 
As being a part of one of the teams that qualified through the North American Pre-Qualifier #1 for the IEM Season VI - Global Challenge Kiev, Xmithie planned to go with APictureOfAGoose to the event. But, due to family problems, LemonGoD was unable to attend the event. As a replacement, team captain Atlanta invited his friend cuRtoKy to join as the support player for APictureOfAGoose. Atlanta decided to change to the AD Carry position in order to play with cuRtoKy, since they were close friends and Atlanta believed he would synergize better with cuRtoKy more than Xmithie would. Xmithie took Atlanta's old position of jungler for the team. Despite the roster changes, APictureOfAGoose ended up not attending IEM Kiev.

Around one month after the departure of LemonGoD and the addition of Xmithie into the main lineup, APictureOfAGoose was acquired by mTw and became . This occurred while APictureOfAGoose was competing in the Alienware Arena North America: Winter, where they ended up placing third.

The first major tournament that Xmithie competed in under the  banner was the 2012 MLG Pro Circuit - Spring Championship. Dropping down to the loser's bracket, Xmithie and his team were able to take out vVv Gaming 2–1 to advance to the next round of the loser's bracket. But here  fell to Team Dynamic 2–0, ending the tournament with 9th-12th-place finish.

Despite a disappointing showing at the MLG Spring Championship, Xmithie and  continued to dominate the online tournament scene, taking first at the Solomid NA Invitational 3. Here, Xmithie and his team fell to Team Dynamic 0–2 in their first match of the tournament, dropping down to the loser's bracket of the third SoloMid Invitational. However, here Xmithie and mTw went on a hot streak, sweeping Lzuruha Gaming, Ordinance Gaming, and Team SoloMid 2–0 to advance to the loser's bracket final. There,  continued forward with their momentum in tow, taking out Counter Logic Gaming Black 2–1, qualifying straight to the grand finals as Curse Gaming forfeited their remaining matches. Coming back up from the loser's bracket to face off against the team that put them there, Xmithie and  came out on top in a close 2–1 victory in the first set and swept Team Dynamic 2–0 in the second set to take home first place from the tournament.

Continuing their success in online tournaments, Xmithie took first place on July 6, 2012, at the National ESL Pro Series Season 3 with his team . During the three-month-long online group stage,  placed third, going 4-3 winning 9 games out of 16 by defeating 4Nothing 2–0, Epik Gamer 2–0, Counter Logic Gaming Prime 2–0, and Team Legion 2–0, while falling to Team Dignitas 1–2, Curse Gaming 0–2, and Team SoloMid 0–2. As Team SoloMid was forced to forfeit, mTw moved on up to the grand finals. There, Xmithie carried on the momentum and defeated Team Dignitas 2–0, taking home first place with his team .

Two days later, Xmithie took second place at the fourth SoloMid NA Invitational with team . Xmithie had a powerful start in the first two rounds, eliminating both Curse Gaming and Team Legion 2–1 to advance to the winners bracket final. But there Xmithie's team  were unable to pull out a win, falling just short to Orbit Gaming 1–2. However, once again Orbit Gaming was able to pull out on top, taking mTw out in a close 2–1.

Xmithie participated in the Leaguecraft ggClassic Presented by Arqade with his team . In the group stages, his team pulled out an impressive 4-1 finish, taking second place, defeating 4Nothing, Orbit Gaming, Taipei Assassins, and Counter Logic Gaming Prime while taking their only loss to Counter Logic Gaming Black. In the playoffs  fell to Team Dynamic 1–2, dropping down to the loser's bracket. There,  took out Curse Gaming 2–0 to move forward to the second round of the loser's bracket. Once again, CLG Black took out  2–0, leaving Xmithie with a third-place finish.

A week after the top three performance at the Leaguecraft ggClassic, Xmithie competed in the SoloMid NA Invitational 5 alongside . Xmithie's team  took out CLG Black 2–1 in the first round, but fell to Team SoloMid 0–2 in the second round, falling to the loser's bracket. There,  went on a hot streak, taking out Team Dynamic, Ordinance Gaming, and Team SoloMid to reach the grand finals of the event. But  fell to Team Dignitas 1–2 in the finals, taking home second place.

At the sixth Solomid NA Invitational, Xmithie took second place with his team . In the tournament,  had a dominant first two rounds, taking out Meat Playground and Ordinance Gaming 2–0 to advance to the winner's bracket final. Here they fell to Team SoloMid 1–2, dropping down to face Ordinance Gaming once again for a shot at the grand finals. Repeating their success,  once again swept Ordinance Gaming 2–0, advancing to the grand finals to get a rematch with Team SoloMid. Xmithie and  had a strong first set, taking out the North American powerhouse 2–0. However, in the second set Team SoloMid rebounded and took out  2–0, leaving Xmithie with a second-place finish.

Season 5 
At the start of Season 5 Xmithie was picked up by CLG for the 2015 LCS Season, replacing Dexter. In the Spring Split CLG finished 3rd in regular season and 5th/6th in playoffs after losing to Team Liquid 0–3. Xmithie was OP Player once in Week 2. In the Summer Split CLG finished in second after losing to Team Liquid in a tiebreaker. This still earned them a bye in the playoffs, where they played Team Impulse and won 3–0, sending them to the finals against longtime rivals TSM. After another 3–0 victory against TSM, CLG qualified for the 2015 World Championship. On September 11 CLG announced that Xmithie was having visa issues and that HuHi would be their starting jungler for the 2015 League of Legends World Championship.

He became a naturalized US citizen in May 2015.

Season 7 
In May 2017, before start of the Summer Split of Season 7, Xmithie transferred from CLG to Immortals. He attended the Season 7 World Championships with Immortals, but the team did not continue past the Group Stage.

Season 8 
Following the announcement that Immortals would not be included in the franchising of the NALCS, Team Liquid announced that Xmithie would be a starter on the team in the 2018 Spring Split on November 22, 2017, along with other Immortals members Olleh and Pobelter. They would become the spring split champions, defeating 100 Thieves 3–0, with Xmithie providing a crucial play in Game 1 by stealing the Baron Nashor from 100 Thieves to help turn the tide in Team Liquid's favor.

During summer split, Team Liquid finished in first place during the regular season and defeated Cloud 9 3–0 in the playoff finals to win the split and ensure their spot at worlds for the first time in Team Liquid's history. However, at worlds they would fail to advance past the group stage, falling to KT Rolster and EDward Gaming.

Tournament results

Notes

References 

Living people
Filipino esports players
People from Bellflower, California
Team Curse players
Team Liquid players
Counter Logic Gaming players
Immortals (esports) players
League of Legends jungle players
Cerritos College alumni
People with acquired American citizenship
MTw players
Year of birth missing (living people)